Mühlheim am Inn is a municipality in the district of Ried im Innkreis in the Austrian state of Upper Austria.

Geography
Mühlheim lies in the Innviertel. About 16 percent of the municipality is forest, and 65 percent is farmland.

References

Cities and towns in Ried im Innkreis District